The following is a list of county roads in Monroe County, Florida.  All the roads here are maintained by Monroe County Department of Roads & Bridges, although not all routes are marked with standard county road shields. In the case of Monroe County, every county road was formerly a state road.

County Road 5A

County Road 5A is Flager Avenue from White Street to Roosevelt Boulevard (SR A1A) in Key West. It was formerly designated SR 5A.

Major intersections
The entire route is in Key West.

County Road 905

County Road 905 is Key Largo Drive from US 1 to the Ocean Reef Club near Grayvik. It was formerly designated SR 905.

Major intersections

County Road 905A

County Road 905A is Card Sound Road from the Miami-Dade County line at the Card Sound Bridge to CR 905. It was formerly designated SR 905A.

Major intersections
The entire route is in North Key Largo.

County Road 931

County Road 931 exists in two sections. The first is 20th Street Ocean and from Sister Creek over the drawbridge of Boot Key Harbor to US 1. The second segment is Sombrero Creek Road from the Corte Del Brisas Traffic Circle to US 1. Both segments were formerly designated SR 931.

County Road 939

County Road 939 was formerly a continuous loop along the contour of the island to and from US 1 connecting Sugarloaf Key and Upper Sugarloaf Key that is now separated by a closed bridge. The western segment is Sugarloaf Boulevard and the eastern segment is Old State Road. It was formerly designated SR 939.

County Road 939A

County Road 939A is a spur route from CR 939 on Sugarloaf Boulevard that serves Sugarloaf Beach. It was formerly designated SR 939A.

County Road 940

County Road 940 is two segments connected by the Overseas Highway (US 1), together traversing Big Pine Key by way of Long Key Drive and Key Deer Boulevard. Both segments were formerly designated SR 940.

County Road 941

County Road 941 is Boca Chica Road from a dead-end at Boca Chica Beach in Boca Chica Key to US 1 in Rockland Key. It was formerly designated SR 941.

County Road 942

County Road 942 (CR 942) is Ocean Drive and East Shore Drive in Summerland Key from a dead-end north to US 1. The road was formerly designated SR 942.

See also
State Roads in the Florida Keys

References

FDOT GIS data, accessed January 2014

 
County